The Chasers is a 1959 Norwegian film directed by Erik Løchen. It was entered into the 1959 Cannes Film Festival.

Cast
 Rolf Søder - Bjørn
 Bente Børsum - Guri (as Benedikte Liseth)
 Tor Stokke - Knut
 Harald Aimarsen
 Bjarne Bø
 Anders Boger
 Carsten Byhring - Cameo appearance
 Kristen Dahl
 Eilert Flyen
 Bonne Gauguin
 Lillemor Grimsgaard
 Odd Grythe
 Olafr Havrevold - Narrator (voice)
 Egil Hjorth-Jenssen
 Matias Lindalen
 Egil Lorck
 Rolf Just Nilsen - Cameo appearance
 Henri Poirier
 Thorleif Reiss

References

External links

1959 films
1950s Norwegian-language films
Norwegian black-and-white films